Offingawier is a neighbourhood of Sneek and former village in Súdwest-Fryslân municipality in the province of Friesland, the Netherlands. It had a population of around 205 in January 2017. In 1984, it was annexed by the city of Sneek and became a neighbourhood.

History
The village was first mentioned in the 13th century as Vffenwere, and means "terp of the people of Offa (person)". Offingawier is a terp (artificial living hill village).

The Dutch Reformed church was built in 1882, but contains elements from its 1335 predecessor.

Offingawier was home to 109 people in 1840. In 1984, it was annexed by Sneek. Before 2011, the village was part of the Sneek municipality.

References

External links

Súdwest-Fryslân
Populated places in Friesland